"St. Stephen" is a song by the Grateful Dead, written by Jerry Garcia, Phil Lesh and Robert Hunter and originally released on the 1969 studio album Aoxomoxoa. The same year, a live version of the song was released on Live/Dead, their first concert album. Unlike the studio version, live versions usually included a section of the song called the "William Tell Bridge", which was used to segue into "The Eleven". The song was played frequently in live concerts from the late 1960s to the early 1970s.

The song makes reference to the last days and trial of the 1st century AD saint, St. Stephen, the first martyr of the New Testament of the Bible, who was stoned to death (Acts 7:54-60).

References

1970 singles
Grateful Dead songs